Louis Alphonse Gassion (10 May 1881 – 3 March 1944) is best-known as the father of Édith Piaf, the legendary singer-songwriter who was known as France's national chanteuse and was internationally famous, but he was himself an entertainer, as a circus performer and theatre actor.

Biography

Gassion was born on 10 May 1881 in Falaise, Calvados to Victor Alphonse Gassion, was a horseman in the circus, and Louise Léontine ( Deschamps), the madam of a brothel in Bernay, Normandy. He had seven sisters, two of whom died at a young age. He began his career in the circus with the 'Ciotti' circus, and became a contortionist. At first, he performed with family, then, on his own.

On 4 September 1914, he married Annetta Giovanna Maillard, an Italian-born café singer known under the stage name of Line Marsa. On 19 December 1915, she gave birth to their first child, a daughter- Édith Giovanna, who would go on to become Édith Piaf. He left Édith in the care of his mother when she was two years old, after Annetta and her mother Emma had been neglecting her care. They also had a second child, Herbert (1918-1997).

In 1922, Louis was going to take an engagement in the Caroli circus, but decided to become an independent act, touring with various itinerant circuses. Often, Louis would have Édith sing for the crowds after he performed. This was when she first realised her talent for singing. On 4 June 1929, Louis divorced Annetta, due to her substance abuse. In 1932, when Édith left to live with her boyfriend Louis Dupont and friend Simone Bertaut, he married Jeanne Georgette L'Hôte, with whom he had a third child, Dénise, born in 1931.

Death
Gassion died of lung cancer on 3 March 1944 in Paris, aged 62. He is buried alongside his daughter (Piaf), son-in-law, and granddaughter at Père Lachaise Cemetery.

In popular culture
In 2007, Louis Gassion was portrayed by Jean-Paul Rouve in Olivier Dahan's biopic of Édith Piaf's life, La Vie en rose.

References

1881 births
1944 deaths
French circus performers
Deaths from lung cancer in France
Édith Piaf
People from Falaise, Calvados